In physics and geometry, a catenary is the curve that an idealized hanging chain or cable assumes under its own weight when supported only at its ends in a uniform gravitational field.

The catenary curve has a U-like shape, superficially similar in appearance to a parabola, which it is not.

The catenary is also called the alysoid, chainette, or, particularly in the materials sciences, funicular. Rope statics describes catenaries in a classic statics problem involving a hanging rope.

Mathematically, the catenary curve is the graph of the hyperbolic cosine function. The surface of revolution of the catenary curve, the catenoid, is a minimal surface, specifically a minimal surface of revolution. A hanging chain will assume a shape of least potential energy which is a catenary. Galileo Galilei in 1638 discussed the catenary in the book Two New Sciences recognizing that it was different from a parabola. The mathematical properties of the catenary curve were studied by Robert Hooke in the 1670s, and its equation was derived by Leibniz, Huygens and Johann Bernoulli in 1691.

Catenaries and related curves are used in architecture and engineering (e.g., in the design of bridges and arches so that forces do not result in bending moments). In the offshore oil and gas industry, "catenary" refers to a steel catenary riser, a pipeline suspended between a production platform and the seabed that adopts an approximate catenary shape. In the rail industry it refers to the overhead wiring that transfers power to trains. (This often supports a lighter contact wire, in which case it does not follow a true catenary curve.)

In optics and electromagnetics, the hyperbolic cosine and sine functions are basic solutions to Maxwell's equations. The symmetric modes consisting of two evanescent waves would form a catenary shape.

History

The word "catenary" is derived from the Latin word catēna, which means "chain". The English word "catenary" is usually attributed to Thomas Jefferson,
who wrote in a letter to Thomas Paine on the construction of an arch for a bridge:

It is often said that Galileo thought the curve of a hanging chain was parabolic. However, in his Two New Sciences (1638), Galileo wrote that a hanging cord is only an approximate parabola, correctly observing that this approximation improves in accuracy as the curvature gets smaller and is almost exact when the elevation is less than 45°. The fact that the curve followed by a chain is not a parabola was proven by Joachim Jungius (1587–1657); this result was published posthumously in 1669.

The application of the catenary to the construction of arches is attributed to Robert Hooke, whose "true mathematical and mechanical form" in the context of the rebuilding of St Paul's Cathedral  alluded to a catenary. Some much older arches approximate catenaries, an example of which is the Arch of Taq-i Kisra in Ctesiphon.

In 1671, Hooke announced to the Royal Society that he had solved the problem of the optimal shape of an arch, and in 1675 published an encrypted solution as a Latin anagram in an appendix to his Description of Helioscopes, where he wrote that he had found "a true mathematical and mechanical form of all manner of Arches for Building." He did not publish the solution to this anagram in his lifetime, but in 1705 his executor provided it as ut pendet continuum flexile, sic stabit contiguum rigidum inversum, meaning "As hangs a flexible cable so, inverted, stand the touching pieces of an arch."

In 1691, Gottfried Leibniz, Christiaan Huygens, and Johann Bernoulli derived the equation in response to a challenge by Jakob Bernoulli; their solutions were published in the Acta Eruditorum for June 1691. David Gregory wrote a treatise on the catenary in 1697 in which he provided an incorrect derivation of the correct differential equation.

Euler proved in 1744 that the catenary is the curve which, when rotated about the -axis, gives the surface of minimum surface area (the catenoid) for the given bounding circles. Nicolas Fuss gave equations describing the equilibrium of a chain under any force in 1796.

Inverted catenary arch

Catenary arches are often used in the construction of kilns. To create the desired curve, the shape of a hanging chain of the desired dimensions is transferred to a form which is then used as a guide for the placement of bricks or other building material.

The Gateway Arch in St. Louis, Missouri, United States is sometimes said to be an (inverted) catenary, but this is incorrect. It is close to a more general curve called a flattened catenary, with equation , which is a catenary if . While a catenary is the ideal shape for a freestanding arch of constant thickness, the Gateway Arch is narrower near the top. According to the U.S. National Historic Landmark nomination for the arch, it is a "weighted catenary" instead. Its shape corresponds to the shape that a weighted chain, having lighter links in the middle, would form. The logo for McDonald's, the Golden Arches, while intended to be two joined parabolas, is also based on the catenary.

Catenary bridges

In free-hanging chains, the force exerted is uniform with respect to length of the chain, and so the chain follows the catenary curve. The same is true of a simple suspension bridge or "catenary bridge," where the roadway follows the cable.

A stressed ribbon bridge is a more sophisticated structure with the same catenary shape.

However, in a suspension bridge with a suspended roadway, the chains or cables support the weight of the bridge, and so do not hang freely. In most cases the roadway is flat, so when the weight of the cable is negligible compared with the weight being supported, the force exerted is uniform with respect to horizontal distance, and the result is a parabola, as discussed below (although the term "catenary" is often still used, in an informal sense). If the cable is heavy then the resulting curve is between a catenary and a parabola.

Anchoring of marine objects

The catenary produced by gravity provides an advantage to heavy anchor rodes. An anchor rode (or anchor line) usually consists of chain or cable or both. Anchor rodes are used by ships, oil rigs, docks, floating wind turbines, and other marine equipment which must be anchored to the seabed.

When the rope is slack, the catenary curve presents a lower angle of pull on the anchor or mooring device than would be the case if it were nearly straight. This enhances the performance of the anchor and raises the level of force it will resist before dragging. To maintain the catenary shape in the presence of wind, a heavy chain is needed, so that only larger ships in deeper water can rely on this effect. Smaller boats also rely on catenary to maintain maximum holding power.

Mathematical description

Equation

The equation of a catenary in Cartesian coordinates has the form

where  is the hyperbolic cosine function, and where  is the distance of the lowest point above the x axis. All catenary curves are similar to each other, since changing the parameter  is equivalent to a uniform scaling of the curve.

The Whewell equation for the catenary is

where  is the tangential angle and  the arc length.

Differentiating gives

and eliminating  gives the Cesàro equation

where  is the curvature.

The radius of curvature is then

which is the length of the normal between the curve and the -axis.

Relation to other curves
When a parabola is rolled along a straight line, the roulette curve traced by its focus is a catenary. The envelope of the directrix of the parabola is also a catenary. The involute from the vertex, that is the roulette traced by a point starting at the vertex when a line is rolled on a catenary, is the tractrix.

Another roulette, formed by rolling a line on a catenary, is another line. This implies that square wheels can roll perfectly smoothly on a road made of a series of bumps in the shape of an inverted catenary curve. The wheels can be any regular polygon except a triangle, but the catenary must have parameters corresponding to the shape and dimensions of the wheels.

Geometrical properties
Over any horizontal interval, the ratio of the area under the catenary to its length equals , independent of the interval selected. The catenary is the only plane curve other than a horizontal line with this property. Also, the geometric centroid of the area under a stretch of catenary is the midpoint of the perpendicular segment connecting the centroid of the curve itself and the -axis.

Science
A moving charge in a uniform electric field travels along a catenary (which tends to a parabola if the charge velocity is much less than the speed of light ).

The surface of revolution with fixed radii at either end that has minimum surface area is a catenary revolved about the -axis.

Analysis

Model of chains and arches
In the mathematical model the chain (or cord, cable, rope, string, etc.) is idealized by assuming that it is so thin that it can be regarded as a curve and that it is so flexible any force of tension exerted by the chain is parallel to the chain. The analysis of the curve for an optimal arch is similar except that the forces of tension become forces of compression and everything is inverted.
An underlying principle is that the chain may be considered a rigid body once it has attained equilibrium. Equations which define the shape of the curve and the tension of the chain at each point may be derived by a careful inspection of the various forces acting on a segment using the fact that these forces must be in balance if the chain is in static equilibrium.

This is the natural parameterization and has the property that

where  is a unit tangent vector.

A differential equation for the curve may be derived as follows. Let  be the lowest point on the chain, called the vertex of the catenary. The slope  of the curve is zero at  since it is a minimum point. Assume  is to the right of  since the other case is implied by symmetry.

and

and dividing these gives

It is convenient to write

Then

is an equation defining the curve.

After deriving the equations of the curve (in the next section) , one can plug the equation back to obtain the simple equation .

Derivation of equations for the curve
The differential equation given above can be solved to produce equations for the curve.

From

the formula for arc length gives

Then

and

The second of these equations can be integrated to give

and by shifting the position of the -axis,  can be taken to be 0. Then

The -axis thus chosen is called the directrix of the catenary.

The integral of the expression for  can be found using standard techniques, giving

and, again, by shifting the position of the -axis,  can be taken to be 0. Then

The -axis thus chosen passes through the vertex and is called the axis of the catenary.

These results can be used to eliminate  giving

Alternative derivation
The differential equation can be solved using a different approach. From

it follows that

and

Integrating gives,

and

Then

and taking the reciprocal of both sides

Adding and subtracting the last two equations then gives the solution

and

Determining parameters

In general the parameter  is the position of the axis. The equation can be determined in this case as follows:

Translate the axes so that the vertex of the catenary lies on the -axis and its height  is adjusted so the catenary satisfies the standard equation of the curve
 

The curve passes through these points, so the difference of height is

When  is expanded using these expressions the result is

so

However, if both ends of the curve ( and ) are at the same level, it can be shown that

It can also be shown that

and

Variational formulation 
Consider a chain of length  suspended from two points of equal height and at distance . The curve has to minimize its potential energy

and is subject to the constraint 

The modified Lagrangian is therefore 

where  is the Lagrange multiplier to be determined. As the independent variable  does not appear in the Lagrangian, we can use the Beltrami identity 

where  is an integration constant, in order to obtain a first integral

This is an ordinary first order differential equation that can be solved by the method of separation of variables. Its solution is the usual hyperbolic cosine where the parameters are obtained from the constraints.

Generalizations with vertical force

Nonuniform chains
If the density of the chain is variable then the analysis above can be adapted to produce equations for the curve given the density, or given the curve to find the density.

Let  denote the weight per unit length of the chain, then the weight of the chain has magnitude

Balancing forces as in the uniform chain produces

and

and therefore

Differentiation then gives

Suspension bridge curve

A similar analysis can be done to find the curve followed by the cable supporting a suspension bridge with a horizontal roadway. Proceeding as before gives the differential equation

This is solved by simple integration to get

and so the cable follows a parabola. If the weight of the cable and supporting wires is not negligible then the analysis is more complex.

Catenary of equal strength
In a catenary of equal strength, the cable is strengthened according to the magnitude of the tension at each point, so its resistance to breaking is constant along its length. Assuming that the strength of the cable is proportional to its density per unit length, the weight, per unit length of the chain can be written , where  is constant, and the analysis for nonuniform chains can be applied.

In this case the equations for tension are

Combining gives

and by differentiation

where  is the radius of curvature.

The solution to this is

Other relations are

The curve was studied 1826 by Davies Gilbert and, apparently independently, by Gaspard-Gustave Coriolis in 1836.

Recently, it was shown that this type of catenary could act as a building block of electromagnetic metasurface and was known as "catenary of equal phase gradient".

Elastic catenary
In an elastic catenary, the chain is replaced by a spring which can stretch in response to tension. The spring is assumed to stretch in accordance with Hooke's Law. Specifically, if  is the natural length of a section of spring, then the length of the spring with tension  applied has length

The curve followed by an elastic spring can now be derived following a similar method as for the inelastic spring.

The equations for tension of the spring are

and

from which

Write

so

Then 

from which

Integrating gives the parametric equations

So

are parametric equations for the curve. At the rigid limit where  is large, the shape of the curve reduces to that of a non-elastic chain.

Other generalizations

Chain under a general force
With no assumptions being made regarding the force  acting on the chain, the following analysis can be made.

The chain is flexible so it can only exert a force parallel to itself. Since tension is defined as the force that the chain exerts on itself,  must be parallel to the chain. In other words,

These forces must balance so

These equations can be used as the starting point in the analysis of a flexible chain acting under any external force.

See also
 Catenary arch
 Chain fountain or self-siphoning beads
 Overhead catenary – power lines suspended over rail or tram vehicles
 Roulette (curve) – an elliptic/hyperbolic catenary
 Troposkein – the shape of a spun rope
 Weighted catenary

Notes

Bibliography

Further reading

External links

 
 
 Catenary curve calculator
 Catenary at The Geometry Center
 "Catenary" at Visual Dictionary of Special Plane Curves
 The Catenary - Chains, Arches, and Soap Films.
 Cable Sag Error Calculator – Calculates the deviation from a straight line of a catenary curve and provides derivation of the calculator and references.
 Dynamic as well as static cetenary curve equations derived – The equations governing the shape (static case) as well as dynamics (dynamic case) of a centenary is derived. Solution to the equations discussed.
 The straight line, the catenary, the brachistochrone, the circle, and Fermat Unified approach to some geodesics.
 Ira Freeman "A General Form of the Suspension Bridge Catenary" Bulletin of the AMS

Roulettes (curve)
Differential equations
Exponentials
Analytic geometry